Yueyahe Subdistrict is a subdistrict situated within Hebei District, Tianjin, China. It borders Jianchang Avenue and Jinzhong Subdistricts to its north, Huaming Subdistrict to its east, Changzhou Avenue Subdistrict to its south, and Jiangdu Road Subdistrict to its west. According to the 2010 census, the subdistrict's population was 85,564.

The subdistrict was named after Yueya River that runs through the region.

History

Administrative divisions 
In 2021, Yueyahe Subdistrict was divided into 13 residential communities. They are listed in the table below:

References 

Township-level divisions of Tianjin
Hebei District, Tianjin